

Roman Empire

Events
 476: Invasion of Germanic tribes and fall of the Western Roman Empire leads to eclipse of Latin as the European Lingua franca; Germanic and Celtic vernaculars begin process of becoming literary languages.

Roman poets
 Rutilius Claudius Namatianus flourishes, writing in Latin.
 Sidonius Apollinaris (430–489), in Lugdunum, Gaul, writing in Latin.
 Magnus Felix Ennodius (474 – July 17, 521), Bishop of Pavia and poet, writing in Latin
 Coluthus of Lycopolis (fl. 491–518), writing in Greek.
 Jacob of Serugh (451 – November 521), writing in Syriac
 Blossius Aemilius Dracontius (c. 455 – c. 505), writing in Latin in Carthage

Roman works
 Blossius Aemilius Dracontius, Satisfactio

South Asia

Poets
 Probable date of Kālidāsa, Sanskrit poet, author of Meghadūta

Works
 Cilappatikaram, one of Five Great Epics of Tamil literature.

China

Poets
 Tao Qian, also known as Tao Yuanming (陶淵明) (365–427)
 Xie Lingyun (385–433)
 Bao Zhao (鮑照, also known as Mingyuan (明遠)) (c.414–September 466, executed), poet and official

Timeline
 427 – Tao Qian , also known as Tao Yuanming 陶淵明, died (born 365), Chinese poet
 430 – Sidonius Apollinaris born (died 489), in Lugdunum, Gaul, writing in Latin
 433 – Xie Lingyun died (born 385), Chinese poet
 451 – Jacob of Serugh born (died November 521), writing in Syriac
 455 – Blossius Aemilius Dracontius born about this year (died 505) of Carthage, Latin poet 
 474 – Magnus Felix Ennodius born (died July 17, 521), Bishop of Pavia and Latin poet
 489 – Sidonius Apollinaris died (born 430), in Lugdunum, Gaul, writing in Latin
 491 – Coluthus of Lycopolis is known to have lived starting this year (fl. 491–518), writing in Greek-language poet

References

5th-century poems
05
Poetry